DUnit is an automated unit testing framework for Embarcadero Delphi and C++Builder. DUnit allows
Delphi (Object Pascal) and C++Builder developers to use test-driven development.

DUnit's original code was written by Juanco Añez and is based on JUnit by Kent Beck and Erich Gamma.  
Several developers now maintain DUnit as a project on SourceForge.

DUnit became a standard part of Delphi starting with Delphi 2005. Two key files provide most of the test framework functionality: TestFramework.pas and GUITestRunner.pas.

DUnit extensions 

PascalMock provide an extension to DUnit with the class TMockObjectTestCase which allow to easily use Mock object in unit tests.

TestGrip uses DUnit to create and maintain unit tests as an extension of the Delphi IDE

TestInsight provides a tight IDE integration where tests are automatically run in background after code changes/compiles.

References

External links 
 DUnit project page on SourceForge
 DUnit easy "Getting Started" guide 
 PascalMock project page on SourceForge
 TestGrip page

Extreme programming
Unit testing frameworks